QGIS  is a free and open-source cross-platform desktop geographic information system (GIS) application that supports viewing, editing, printing, and analysis of geospatial data.

Functionality
QGIS functions as geographic information system (GIS) software, allowing users to analyze and edit spatial information, in addition to composing and exporting graphical maps. QGIS supports raster, vector and mesh layers. Vector data is stored as either point, line, or polygon features. Multiple formats of raster images are supported, and the software can georeference images.

QGIS supports shapefiles, personal geodatabases, dxf, MapInfo, PostGIS, and other industry-standard formats. Web services, including Web Map Service and Web Feature Service, are also supported to allow use of data from external sources.

QGIS integrates with other open-source GIS packages, including PostGIS, GRASS GIS, and MapServer. Plugins written in Python or C++ extend QGIS's capabilities. Plugins can geocode using the Google Geocoding API, perform geoprocessing functions similar to those of the standard tools found in ArcGIS, and interface with PostgreSQL/PostGIS, SpatiaLite and MySQL databases.

QGIS can also be used with SAGA GIS and Kosmo.

Development
Gary Sherman began development of Quantum GIS in early 2002, and it became an incubator project of the Open Source Geospatial Foundation in 2007. Version 1.0 was released in January 2009.

In 2013, along with release of version 2.0 the name was officially changed from Quantum GIS to QGIS to avoid confusion as both names had been used in parallel.)

Written mainly in C++, QGIS makes extensive use of the Qt library. In addition to Qt, required dependencies of QGIS include GEOS and SQLite. GDAL, GRASS GIS, PostGIS, and PostgreSQL are also recommended, as they provide access to additional data formats.

, QGIS is available for multiple operating systems including Mac OS X, Linux, Unix, and Microsoft Windows. A mobile version of QGIS was under development for Android .

QGIS can also be used as a graphical user interface to GRASS. QGIS has a small install footprint on the host file system compared to commercial GISs and generally requires less RAM and processing power; hence it can be used on older hardware or running simultaneously with other applications where CPU power may be limited.

QGIS is maintained by volunteer developers who regularly release updates and bug fixes. , developers have translated QGIS into 48 languages and the application is used internationally in academic and professional environments. Several companies offer support and feature development services.

Function

QGIS can display multiple layers containing different sources or depictions of sources.

In order to prepare printed map with QGIS, Print Layout is used. It can be used for adding multiple map views, labels, legends, etc.

Licensing
As a free software application under GNU GPLv2, QGIS can be freely modified to perform different or more specialized tasks. Two examples are the QGIS Browser and QGIS Server applications, which use the same code for data access and rendering, but present different front-end interfaces.

Adoption
Many public and private organizations have adopted QGIS, including:
 US National Security Agency
 National Geospatial-Intelligence Agency
 Austrian state of Vorarlberg
 The Economist 
 Swiss cantons of Glarus and Solothurn
 New Zealand's Land Information public service department

Release History
"LTR" indicates a Long Term Release.  Detailed changelogs are available for releases 2.0 and later.

References

External links

 

Free GIS software
Free software programmed in C++
Software that uses Qt